Rodtang Jitmuangnon (born July 23, 1997) is a Thai Muay Thai fighter. He currently competes in ONE Championship and is the reigning ONE Flyweight Muay Thai World Champion. Jitmuangnon is also a former Omnoi Stadium 130lb Champion and MAX Muay Thai 125lb Champion.

As of December 2020, The Nation considers him the best pound-for-pound Muay Thai fighter in the world.

Biography

Rodtang  had his first Muay Thai fight at the age of 8 to make money and help his family. At 14, he moved to Bangkok to join the Jitmuangnon gym.

On January 2, 2016, Rodtang won his first Muay Thai title when he defeated Petchprakan Kor. Klanbut by decision to claim the MAX Muay Thai 125 lb Championship. On February 6, 2016, he successfully defended his MAX 125 lb title belt against Petchprakan, winning by decision once again.

On July 29, 2017, he defeated Chai Sor Jor Toypadriew to win the vacant Omnoi Stadium 130lb title. Rodtang retained the title on April 28, 2018 by defeating Phetnamngam Aor Kwanmuang.

On June 16, 2018, Rodtang faced Japanese kickboxing superstar Tenshin Nasukawa under kickboxing rules at Rise 125 in Tokyo, the fight was very exciting and contested. The judges gave a draw after 5 rounds and an extra round had to be fought, Rodtang lost that round and the fight but some observers thought he had done enough to get the win prior to that.

In August 2018, Rodtang faced Chorfah Tor Sangtiennoi. This fight would later be elected Rajadamnern Stadium Best Fight of the Year.

Throughout 2017 and 2018, Rodtang went on a 10-fight winning streak in the stadiums which culminated in a fight against Rungkit Morbeskamala for the vacant Rajadamnern 130lbs title. Rodtang lost by decision.

On August 16, 2019, Rodtang faced Saeksan Or. Kwanmuang in the Songkhla Province, the fight was deemed underwhelming considering the fight style of the two participants. The rematch a month later was the back and forth war fans expected and received the award for Fight of the year at Rajadamnern Stadium.

On January 31, 2020, Rodtang faced Yodlekpet Or. Pitisak in the biggest Muay Thai card of the year in Phuket. Despite a size differential and a side bet of 1 million baht from the Teeded99 camp in play, Rodtang dominated his opponent and won a clear decision against arguably one of his best opponents yet.

Rodtang suffered his first loss since October 25, 2018 against Kaonar P.K.SaenchaiMuaythaiGym at Rajadamnern Stadium on February 27, 2020.

He was able to avenge his loss to Kaonar in a rematch at the R1 UFA event held in World Siam Stadium on October 5, 2020, winning the five-round decision.

On November 24, 2020, Yokkao founder, Philip Villa, announced on Instagram that Rodtang had signed a three-year sponsorship deal with his Muay Thai brand. His camp mate, Nuenglanlek Jitmuangnon also signed a three-year sponsorship deal with the brand.

ONE Championship
After signing with ONE Championship, Rodtang made his ONE Super Series debut against Sergio Wielzen on September 22, 2018 at ONE Championship: Conquest of Heroes in Jakarta. He defeated Wielzen by unanimous decision.

ONE Flyweight Muay Thai World Champion
On August 2, 2019 at ONE Championship: Dawn of Heroes in Manila, Rodtang faced Jonathan Haggerty for the ONE Flyweight Muay Thai World Championship after Haggerty previously called him out at ONE Championship: For Honor. After a slow start to the fight, Rodtang knocked Haggerty down in the fourth round and went on to win the fight by unanimous decision, also being crowned the new ONE Flyweight Muay Thai World Champion. In his first title defense, Rodtang defeated Walter Goncalves by split decision at ONE Championship: Century on October 13, 2019.

Rodtang then made his second title defense of the ONE Flyweight Muay Thai World Championship in a rematch against Jonathan Haggerty at ONE Championship: A New Tomorrow on January 10, 2020. In a fight where he floored Haggerty a total of 4 times, including a liver shot in the first round, Rodtang went on to retain his ONE Flyweight Muay Thai Title with a third-round TKO victory after delivering 3 knockdowns in that same round.

Rodtang next faced Petchdam Petchyindee Academy for a third time as he is scheduled to defend the ONE Flyweight Muay Thai World Championship a third time at ONE Championship: No Surrender on July 31, 2020. He defeated Petchdam and retained the title by majority decision after five rounds.

On October 5, 2020, Rodtang faced Kaonar P.K.SaenchaiMuaythaiGym in a rematch which was arranged to raise money for charity. Rodtang won the fight via unanimous decision.

A tenured Muay Thai fighter, Rodtang was scheduled to make his kickboxing debut against Alejandro Rivas at ONE Championship: Fists Of Fury on February 26, 2021. Rivas was later replaced by Tagir Khalilov, whom Rodtang beat by split decision.

He was expected to face Jacob Smith at ONE on TNT 1 on April 7, 2021. However, Smith was later pulled from the fight and replaced with Danial Williams. Rodtang defeated Williams by unanimous decision.

Special-rules fight with Demetrious Johnson 
On September 15, 2021, it was announced that Rodtang would face the former UFC Flyweight Champion and 2019 ONE Flyweight Grand-Prix Champion, Demetrious Johnson. The fight was scheduled to take place on December 5, 2021 under special rules, and headlined the ONE: X event. Rounds 1 and 3 were contested under the ONE Muay Thai ruleset, and rounds 2 and 4 were contested under the ONE MMA ruleset. However, due to the pandemic shutdowns, the event was rescheduled for March 26, 2022. Rodtang lost the bout after being choked unconscious via a rear-naked choke in the second round.

2022 ONE Muay Thai Flyweight GP
The bout with Jacob Smith was rebooked to serve as a quarterfinal bout of the ONE Muay Thai Flyweight Grand Prix at ONE 157 on May 20, 2022. He won the bout via unanimous decision. This win earned Rodtang his first Performance of the Night bonus award.

Rodtang was expected to face Savvas Michael in the tournament semifinals at ONE on Prime Video 1 on August 27, 2022. Two days before the bout was supposed to take place, Rodtang failed to provide a sample for a mandatory hydration test and was not permitted to weigh in. Rodtang withdrew from the fight on August 25, due to illness.

Continued title reign
Rodtang made his fourth defense title against the reigning ONE Strawweight Muay Thai champion Joseph Lasiri at ONE on Prime Video 4 on November 19, 2022. He defended the title via unanimous decision.

Rodtang was scheduled to face Daniel Puertas in a kickboxing match on January 14, 2023, at ONE on Prime Video 6. However, Puertas faced Superlek Kiatmuu9 for the vacant ONE Flyweight Kickboxing World Championship and Rodtang instead faced Jiduo Yibu. At weigh-ins, Rodtang weighed in at 136.5 pounds, 1.5 pounds over the flyweight limit. The bout proceeded at catchweight with Rodtang fined 20% of his purse, which went to his opponent Yibu. He won the fight via unanimous decision.

Rodtang is scheduled to challenge Superlek Kiatmuu9 for the ONE Flyweight Kickboxing World Championship at ONE Fight Night 8 on March 25, 2023.

Rodtang is scheduled to defense the title against Edgar Tabares on May 5, 2023, at ONE Fight Night 10.

Personal life
Rodtang previously dated former ONE Atomweight Muay Thai World Champion and Atomweight Kickboxing World Champion Stamp Fairtex. In February 2023, he married fellow fighter Aida Looksaikongdin. Rodtang was ordained a Buddhist monk a month earlier, but shortly after the wedding announced he had converted to Islam, the same religion as Aida.

Titles and accomplishments

 ONE Championship
ONE Flyweight Muay Thai World Championship (One time; current) 
Four successful title defenses 
Performance of the Night (One time) 
ONE Super Series Fight of the Year 2021 
Most decision wins in ONE Championship (10) 
Longest winning streak in ONE Championship (12)
 Rajadamnern Stadium
 2019 Rajadamnern Stadium Fight of the Year 
 2018 Rajadamnern Stadium Fight of the Year 
 Omnoi Stadium 
 2017 Omnoi Stadium 130lbs Champion<ref>{{cite web|url=https://www.siamsport.co.th/boxing/view/15906|title=สายโหดจากป่าพะยอม... "รถถัง จิตรเมืองนนท์|date=2 August 2017|website=www.siamsport.co.th}}</ref>
 MAX Muay Thai 
 2016 MAX Muay Thai 125lbs Champion

Fight record

|-  style="background:;"
| 2023-05-05 || ||align=left| Edgar Tabares || ONE Fight Night 10 || Broomfield, Colorado, United States ||  ||  || 
|-
! style=background:white colspan=9 |
|-  style="background:#;"
| 2023-03-25||   ||align=left| Superlek Kiatmuu9 ||  ONE Fight Night 8 || Kallang, Singapore ||   ||   || 
|-
! style=background:White colspan=9 |
|-  style="background:#cfc;"
| 2023-01-14 || Win ||align=left| Jiduo Yibu || ONE Fight Night 6 || Bangkok, Thailand || Decision (unanimous) || 3 || 3:00 
|-  style="background:#cfc;"
| 2022-11-19 || Win ||align=left| Joseph Lasiri || ONE on Prime Video 4 || Kallang, Singapore || Decision (unanimous) || 5 || 3:00
|-
! style=background:white colspan=9 |
|-  style="background:#cfc;"
| 2022-05-20|| Win ||align=left| Jacob Smith ||  ONE 157 || Kallang, Singapore || Decision (unanimous) || 3 || 3:00
|-
! style=background:white colspan=9 |
|- style="background:#cfc;"
| 2021-04-07|| Win ||align=left|  Danial Williams || ONE on TNT 1 || Kallang, Singapore || Decision (unanimous) || 3 || 3:00
|-  style="background:#cfc;"
| 2021-02-26|| Win ||align=left| Tagir Khalilov || ONE Championship: Fists Of Fury || Kallang, Singapore || Decision (Split) || 3 || 3:00
|-  style="background:#cfc;"
| 2020-11-14||Win ||align=left| Yodkhuntap SorGor.SuNgaiGym||  Jitmuangnon + Sor.CafeMuayThai, OrTorGor.3 Stadium || Nonthaburi Province, Thailand ||Decision || 5 || 3:00
|-  style="background:#cfc;"
| 2020-10-05|| Win ||align=left| Kaonar P.K.SaenchaiMuaythaiGym ||  R1 UFA, World Siam Stadium || Bangkok, Thailand || Decision (Unanimous) || 5 || 3:00
|-  style="background:#cfc;"
| 2020-07-31|| Win ||align=left| Petchdam PetchyindeeAcademy || ONE Championship: No Surrender || Bangkok, Thailand || Decision (Majority) || 5 || 3:00  
|-
! style=background:white colspan=9 |
|-  style="background:#fbb;"
| 2020-02-27|| Loss||align=left| Kaonar P.K. Saenchai Muaythaigym || Rajadamnern Stadium || Bangkok, Thailand ||Decision || 5||3:00
|-  style="background:#cfc;"
| 2020-01-31|| Win ||align=left| Yodlekpet Or. Pitisak || Phuket Super Fight Real Muay Thai || Mueang Phuket District, Thailand || Decision || 5 || 3:00
|-  style="background:#cfc;"
| 2020-01-10|| Win ||align=left| Jonathan Haggerty || ONE Championship: A New Tomorrow || Bangkok, Thailand || TKO (3 Knockdown Rule) || 3 || 2:39     
|-
! style=background:white colspan=9 |
|-  style="background:#cfc;"
| 2019-10-13||Win ||align=left| Walter Goncalves || ONE Championship: Century || Tokyo, Japan ||Decision (Split) || 5 ||3:00
|-
! style=background:white colspan=9 |
|-  style="background:#cfc;"
| 2019-09-12||Win ||align=left| Saeksan Or. Kwanmuang || Rajadamnern Stadium || Bangkok, Thailand ||Decision (Unanimous) || 5 ||3:00
|-  style="background:#cfc;"
| 2019-08-16||Win ||align=left| Saeksan Or. Kwanmuang || Supit + Sor. Sommai Birthday Fights|| Songkhla, Thailand || Decision||5  ||3:00
|-  style="background:#cfc;"
| 2019-08-02|| Win ||align=left| Jonathan Haggerty || ONE Championship: Dawn Of Heroes || Manila, Philippines || Decision (Unanimous) || 5 || 3:00
|-
! style=background:white colspan=9 |
|-  style="background:#cfc;"
| 2019-05-10|| Win ||align=left| Sok Thy || ONE Championship: Warriors Of Light || Bangkok, Thailand || TKO (Low kicks) || 2 || 1:06
|-  style="background:#cfc;"
| 2019-03-31|| Win ||align=left| Hakim Hamech || ONE Championship: A New Era || Tokyo, Japan || Decision (Split) || 3 || 3:00
|-  style="background:#cfc;"
| 2019-03-07|| Win ||align=left| Chorfah Tor.Sangtiennoi || Rajadamnern Stadium  || Bangkok, Thailand || Decision || 5 || 3:00
|-  style="background:#cfc;"
| 2019-01-25|| Win ||align=left| Fahdi Khaled || ONE Championship: Hero's Ascent || Manila, Philippines || Decision (Unanimous) || 3 || 3:00
|-  style="background:#cfc;"
| 2018-11-17|| Win ||align=left| Yuki || RISE 129 || Tokyo, Japan || Decision (Unanimous) || 3 || 3:00
|-  style="background:#fbb;"
| 2018-10-25|| Loss ||align=left| Rungkit Morbeskamala || Rajadamnern Stadium  || Bangkok, Thailand || Decision || 5 || 3:00 
|-  bgcolor="#cfc"
! style=background:white colspan=9 |
|-  style="background:#cfc;"
| 2018-09-22|| Win ||align=left| Sergio Wielzen || ONE Championship: Conquest of Heroes || Jakarta, Indonesia || Decision (Unanimous) || 3 || 3:00
|-  style="background:#cfc;"
| 2018-08-30|| Win ||align=left| Chorfah Tor.Sangtiennoi || Rajadamnern Stadium  || Bangkok, Thailand || Decision || 5 || 3:00
|-  style="background:#cfc;"
| 2018-08-07|| Win ||align=left| Superbank Mor Ratanabandit || Wandetchit + Birthday Supit + Muaydee VitheeThai Super Fight || Songkhla, Thailand || Decision || 5 || 3:00
|-  style="background:#cfc;"
| 2018-07-12|| Win ||align=left| Mongkonkeaw Sor.Sommai || Rajadamnern Stadium  || Bangkok, Thailand || KO (Left hook) || 4 ||
|-  style="background:#fbb;"
| 2018-06-16|| Loss ||align=left| Tenshin Nasukawa || RISE 125 || Tokyo, Japan || Ext.R Decision (Unanimous) || 6 || 3:00 
|-  bgcolor="#cfc"
! style=background:white colspan=9 |
|-  style="background:#cfc;"
| 2018-05-23|| Win ||align=left| Rodlek Jaotalaytong || Rajadamnern Stadium  || Bangkok, Thailand || Decision || 5 || 3:00
|-  style="background:#cfc;"
| 2018-04-28|| Win ||align=left| Phetnamngam Aor.Kwanmuang || Siam Omnoi Stadium  || Samut Sakhon, Thailand || Decision || 5 || 3:00 
|-  bgcolor="#cfc"
! style=background:white colspan=9 |
|-  style="background:#cfc;"
| 2018-03-28|| Win ||align=left| Suakim PK Saenchaimuaythaigym || WanParunchai + Poonseua Sanjorn  || Nakhon Si Thammarat, Thailand || Decision || 5 || 3:00
|-  style="background:#cfc;"
| 2018-02-08|| Win ||align=left| Petchdam PetchyindeeAcademy || Rajadamnern Stadium  || Bangkok, Thailand || Decision || 5 || 3:00
|-  style="background:#cfc;"
| 2018-01-17|| Win ||align=left| Phetnamngam Aor.Kwanmuang || Big One Super Fight promotion  || Yala, Thailand || Decision || 5 || 3:00
|-  style="background:#cfc;"
| 2017-12-21|| Win ||align=left| Mongkonkeaw Sor.Sommai || Rajadamnern Stadium  || Bangkok, Thailand || Decision || 5 || 3:00
|-  style="background:#cfc;"
| 2017-11-28|| Win ||align=left| Pakkalek Tor.Laksong || Lumpinee Stadium  || Bangkok, Thailand || Decision || 5 || 3:00
|-  style="background:#cfc;"
| 2017-11-03|| Win ||align=left| PhetMorakot Sor.Sommai || Lumpinee Stadium  || Bangkok, Thailand || Decision || 5 || 3:00
|-  style="background:#c5d2ea;"
| 2017-09-30|| Draw ||align=left| Ncedo Gomba || Top King World Series 29 || Bangkok, Thailand || Decision || 3 || 3:00
|-  style="background:#cfc;"
| 2017-09-09|| Win ||align=left| Mongkonkeaw Sor.Sommai ||Samui Fight promotion  ||  Ko Samui, Thailand || Decision || 5 || 3:00 
|-
! style=background:white colspan=9 |
|-  style="background:#cfc;"
| 2017-08-18|| Win ||align=left| Sakchainoi M.U.Den ||  || Surat Thani Thailand || KO (Punches) || 3 ||
|-  style="background:#cfc;"
| 2017-07-29|| Win ||align=left| Chai Sor.Jor.Toypadriew || Omnoi Stadium || Samut Sakhon, Thailand || Decision || 5 || 3:00 
|-
! style=background:white colspan=9 |
|-  style="background:#cfc;"
| 2017-07-09|| Win ||align=left| Yang Ming || Topking World Series - EM Legend 21 || China || KO (Body punches)|| 2 ||
|-  style="background:#cfc;"
| 2017-06-11|| Win ||align=left| Kom Awute F.A.Group || Omnoi Stadium  || Samut Sakhon, Thailand || Decision || 5 || 3:00
|-  style="background:#cfc;"
| 2017-05-27|| Win ||align=left| Keisuke Niwa || Topking World Series || China || Decision || 3 || 3:00
|-  style="background:#fbb;"
| 2017-05-04|| Loss ||align=left| Petchdam PetchyindeeAcademy || Rajadamnern Stadium  || Bangkok, Thailand || Decision || 5 || 3:00
|-  style="background:#fbb;"
| 2017-04-06|| Loss ||align=left| Kaimukkao Por.Thairongruangkamai || Rajadamnern Stadium  || Bangkok, Thailand || Decision || 5 || 3:00
|-  style="background:#cfc;"
| 2017-02-26|| Win ||align=left| Sibsaen Tor.Iewjaroentongpuket || Channel 7 Boxing Stadium || Bangkok, Thailand || Decision || 5 || 3:00
|-  style="background:#cfc;"
| 2017-01-28|| Win ||align=left| Mongkonkeaw Sor.Sommai || Nontaburi Stadium || Bangkok, Thailand || Decision || 5 || 3:00
|-  style="background:#cfc;"
| 2016-12-17|| Win ||align=left| Densiam Sor Phansuan || Siam Omnoi Stadium  || Samut Sakhon, Thailand || TKO (Right Hook) ||  ||
|-  style="background:#cfc;"
| 2016-10-02|| Win ||align=left| Chartchay Siapanont || Nontaburi Stadium || Bangkok, Thailand || Decision || 5 || 3:00
|-  style="background:#fbb;"
| 2016-09-08|| Loss ||align=left| Audnoi Kaokraigym ||  || Thailand || Decision || 5 || 3:00
|-  style="background:#cfc;"
| 2016-08-02|| Win ||align=left| Chailek Khwaithonggym ||  ||  Thailand || TKO (Referee Stoppage/Punches) ||  ||
|-  style="background:#cfc;"
| 2016-07-31|| Win ||align=left| Singtong Sor.Yingjaroenkanchang || Nontaburi Stadium || Thailand || Decision || 5 || 3:00
|-  style="background:#cfc;"
| 2016-04-21|| Win ||align=left| Tanoonsueklek Aor.Kwanmuang ||  ||  Thailand || KO || 3 ||
|-  style="background:#cfc;"
| 2016-02-03|| Win ||align=left| Petchprakan Kor. Klanbut || MAX Muay Thai Stadium|| Pattaya, Thailand || Decision || 5 || 3:00 
|-
! style=background:white colspan=9 |
|-  style="background:#cfc;"
| 2016-01-02|| Win ||align=left| Petchprakan Kor. Klanbut || MAX Muay Thai Stadium|| Pattaya, Thailand || Decision || 5 || 3:00 
|-
! style=background:white colspan=9 |
|-  style="background:#cfc;"
| 2016-01-02|| Win ||align=left| Nuathoranee Samchaivisetsuk || MAX Muay Thai Stadium|| Pattaya, Thailand || KO (Punches) || 2 ||
|-  style="background:#cfc;"
| 2015-09-06|| Win ||align=left| Chaichan Sitkaowpraphon || Rajadamnern Stadium || Bangkok, Thailand || Decision || 5 || 3:00
|-  style="background:#fbb;"
| 2015-01-18|| Loss ||align=left| Yodphet Paengkongprab || Channel 7 Boxing Stadium || Thailand || Decision || 5 || 3:00
|-  style="background:#cfc;"
| 2014-11-30|| Win ||align=left| Koh Samui Jaotalaytong || Rajadamnern Stadium || Bangkok, Thailand || Decision || 5 || 3:00
|-  style="background:#fbb;"
| 2013-10-20 || Loss||align=left| Sangtien Sor.Sornsing  || Channel 7 Boxing Stadium || Bangkok, Thailand || KO (Left Elbow)|| 4 ||
|-  style="background:#cfc;"
| 2013-08-28|| Win ||align=left| Thanutong Sor Chokkitchai || Rajadamnern Stadium || Bangkok, Thailand || Decision || 5 || 3:00
|-  style="background:#cfc;"
| 2013-07-19|| Win ||align=left| Chalamkao Sitsorot || Lumpinee Stadium || Bangkok, Thailand || Decision || 5 || 3:00
|- style="background:#cfc;"
| 2013-|| Win ||align=left| Puenkon Tor.Surat || Thepprasit Stadium || Pattaya, Thailand || Decision || 5 || 3:00 
|-
| colspan=9 | Legend'':

Mixed rules record

|-
|  Loss
| align=center| 0–1
| Demetrious Johnson
| Technical Submission (rear-naked choke)
| ONE: X
| 
| align=center|2
| align=center|2:13
| Kallang, Singapore
| 
|-

References

External links
 Rodtang Jitmuangnon at ONE Championship

1997 births
Living people
Featherweight kickboxers
Lightweight kickboxers
Rodtang Jitmuangnon
Rodtang Jitmuangnon
Rodtang Jitmuangnon
ONE Championship kickboxers
ONE Championship champions